Silvester Diggles (24 January 1817 – 21 March 1880) was an Australian artist and musician of British origin, as well as being a noted amateur ornithologist and entomologist.

Biography 
Diggles was born in Liverpool, Lancashire and married Eliza Bradley in 1839, with whom he had two daughters and a son. In 1853 he migrated with his family to Australia, living for a year in Sydney before settling in Brisbane, Queensland, where he taught music and drawing as well as tuning and repairing musical instruments. His wife died in August 1857 and he subsequently married Albina Birkett in January 1858, with whom he had two sons.

Diggles was well known in Brisbane; he was a founder of the Brisbane Choral Society in 1859 and the Brisbane Philharmonic Society in 1861, and was a familiar accompanist at concerts and church services. In 1877 he was given a grand benefit concert by the musicians of the city, and called "the father of music in Brisbane". A religious man, he had joined the New Jerusalem Church in 1846 and served as its leader in Brisbane. He was also a Freemason.

Diggles was a founder of the Queensland Philosophical Society, the predecessor of the Royal Society of Queensland, and helped establish the Queensland Museum, which the society instigated in 1862. He served as the Queensland representative on the 1871/72 solar eclipse expedition to Cape Sidmouth, Far North Queensland, and reported on the birds, insects and scenery there to the Philosophical Society.

Diggles is best known for his authorship of a major ornithological work which was never completely published because of financial problems. He and his niece Rowena Birkett produced some 325 hand-coloured plates of some 600 Australian birds for a work titled The Ornithology of Australia, of which three volumes were published from 1865 to 1870.

The moth genus of Digglesia, the brushed trapdoor spider Ozicrypta digglesi, and the sea snail Zafra digglesi are named after him.

Diggles' health deteriorated from about 1875, a contributing factor being worries about his publishing problems. He died at Kangaroo Point, Brisbane, survived by the two daughters of his first marriage and the two sons of his second and was buried in Toowong Cemetery.

Publication 
A book about Diggles' life, The Bird Man of Brisbane by Louis J. Pigott, was published in 2010 by Boolarong Press.

References

Notes

Sources

 

1817 births
1880 deaths
Australian ornithologists
Australian entomologists
Australian musicians
Australian bird artists
Artists from Liverpool
Musicians from Liverpool
People from Brisbane
Burials at Toowong Cemetery
19th-century Australian painters
19th-century Australian male artists
English emigrants to Australia
19th-century English musicians
Australian male painters